This is a list of the WTBA World Tenpin Bowling Championships medal winners.

Total medal table
As 2019

 http://etbf.eu/his-wor-wch-medaltallies/

Current events

Men

Singles

Doubles

Trios

5er teams

All-events

Masters

Women

Singles

Doubles

Trios

5er teams

All-events

Masters

Discontinued events

Men

8er teams

Women

4er teams

References

Ten-pin bowling competitions
WTBA World Tenpin Bowling Championships